The Probation Wife is a 1919 American silent comedy-drama film directed by Sidney Franklin and starring Norma Talmadge. Talmadge served as her own producer with distribution through Select Pictures.

Copies of this film are held at the Library of Congress and the George Eastman House Motion Picture Collection.

Plot
As described in a film magazine, novelist Harrison Wade (Meighan) goes with his fiancee and a wealthy rouge to a resort where wine and women are to be held for the asking. Disgusted with his fiance's flirtations, he meets Jo (Talmadge), an orphan kept captive, and gives her money to escape. She fails in her attempt and is later sent to a reformatory, from which she escapes and makes her way to the city. To save her from recapture, Wade marries her, promising to divorce her when her probation is over. His former fiance, now married to the millionaire, continues to take Wade, whom she really loves, around with her. Wade's best friend Huntley McMerton (Francis) persuades Jo to appear with him at various cafes in order to get Wade to declare that he loves her. This Wade is finally forced to do, and they then explain their scheme to him and the couple lives happily.

Cast
Norma Talmadge as Josephine Mowbray
Thomas Meighan as Harrison Wade
Florence Billings as Nina Stockley
Alec B. Francis as Huntley McMerton
Walter McEwen as Peter Marr
Amelia Summerville as Eunice Galway
A. Brooke as Lawyer
S. Liston as Matron

References

External links

Lobby posters: #1, #2

1919 films
American silent feature films
Films directed by Sidney Franklin
Films based on short fiction
1919 comedy-drama films
1910s English-language films
American black-and-white films
Selznick Pictures films
1910s American films
Silent American comedy-drama films